Sandra Doller (formerly Miller) (born 1974 Washington, DC) is an American poet and writer.

Life
She attended Amherst College, University of Washington, and University of Chicago.

She received her MFA from the Iowa Writers' Workshop, where she was awarded the two year Iowa Arts Fellowship.

Doller has taught at Hollins University, Cornell College, University of Iowa and in 2007, was Distinguished Visiting Writer at Boise State University. She is currently Associate Professor of Literature & Writing Studies at California State University San Marcos.

In 2003, Sandra Doller founded the international inter-arts journal and press: 1913 a journal of forms  and in 2006 began editing and publishing books on 1913 Press . She still serves as editrice/editor-in-chief of 1913, which publishes diverse contemporary writing alongside early modernist experiments. 1913 Press authors include: John Keene & Christopher Stackhouse, Shin Yu Pai, Biswamit Dwibedy, Arielle Greenberg & Rachel Zucker, Diane Wald, Karena Youtz, Jane Lewty, Scott McFarland, Monica Mody, Ronaldo Wilson, Lily Hoang, and Andy Fitch & Jon Cotner. Each year, 1913 Press publishes an anthology of inter-translation, titled READ, co-edited by Sarah Riggs & Cole Swensen.

She lives in San Diego with her partner and collaborator, the poet and writer Ben Doller (formerly Doyle). In 2007, the two merged their last names: Doyle + Miller = Doller.

Awards and fellowships
 2001-2003: Iowa Arts Fellowship
 2004: Paul Engle-James Michener Fellowship
 2005: Runner-up for Sawtooth Prize from Ahsahta Press
 2012: Winner of the Anomalous Press Translation Prize

Works
 from Memory of the Prose Machine (Drunken Boat) 
 from Leave Your Body Behind (Eleven Eleven)

Books
 Oriflamme Ahsahta Press 2005 
 Chora Ahsahta Press 2010 
 Man Years Subito Press 2011 
 Memory of the Prose Machine CutBank 2013
 Sonneteers Editions Eclipse 2014
 Leave Your Body Behind Les Figues 2014

Anthologies

References

1974 births
Living people
Poets from Washington, D.C.
California State University San Marcos faculty
Amherst College alumni
University of Washington alumni
University of Chicago alumni
Iowa Writers' Workshop alumni
American women poets
21st-century American poets
Hollins University faculty
Cornell College faculty
University of Iowa faculty
Boise State University faculty
21st-century American women writers
American women academics